Daymon Lodovica (born 16 August 1989) in Curaçao is a footballer who plays as a forward. He currently plays for UNDEBA in the Curaçao League and the Curaçao national football team.

Club career
In 2007, he signed for Curaçao League side CRKSV Jong Holland.

International career
He started his international career with Curaçao national football team in 2011.

References 

1989 births
Living people
Curaçao footballers
Curaçao international footballers
Association football forwards
Union Deportivo Banda Abou players
CRKSV Jong Holland players
Sekshon Pagá players